Steven Ultrino is a member of the Massachusetts House of Representatives. A resident of Malden, Massachusetts, he was elected as a Democrat to represent the 33rd Middlesex district. Prior to his election, Ultrino served for several years on the Malden City Council.

See also
 2019–2020 Massachusetts legislature
 2021–2022 Massachusetts legislature

References

Democratic Party members of the Massachusetts House of Representatives
Politicians from Malden, Massachusetts
Living people
Massachusetts city council members
21st-century American politicians
Year of birth missing (living people)